Bokkol  is a town and commune in Mauritania.

On the west of the town there is the Bokkol Mosque (مسجد بوكل) that serves the local community of Bokkol.

Communes of Mauritania